Govindan Rajamohan (born 1970) is an Indian molecular microbiologist, biotechnologist and a Senior principal scientist at the CSIR-Institute of Microbial Technology. He is known for his research on healthcare related infections with special emphasis on Acinetobacter, Klebsiella, ESKAPE, Human microbiome and Thrombolysis. His studies have been documented by way of a number of articles and ResearchGate, an online repository of scientific articles has listed 21 of them. The Department of Biotechnology of the Government of India awarded him the National Bioscience Award for Career Development, one of the highest Indian science awards, for his contributions to biosciences, in 2013.

Selected bibliography

Notes

References 

N-BIOS Prize recipients
Indian scientific authors
Living people
Indian medical academics
Indian medical researchers
Indian molecular biologists
Indian microbiologists
Indian biotechnologists
1970 births